Sadaivarna Pandiyan was a warrior in 14th-century Pandyan dynasty, Tamil Nadu.

References

Year of birth missing
Indian warriors
Year of death missing